St. James Infirmary may refer to:

 "St. James Infirmary Blues", an American folk song
 St. James Infirmary Clinic, a medical and social service organization in San Francisco
 St. James Infirmary (album), a 1982 album by Dave Van Ronk